James Drummond  FSA (1816 – 1877) was an artist and the curator of the National Gallery of Scotland from 1868 to 1877. He was also an early photographer.

Life

He was born in 1816, in John Knox House in the Royal Mile, Edinburgh.

He studied at the Trustees Academy in Edinburgh under Sir William Allan.

He was a member of the Photographic Society of Scotland and was photographed by Hill & Adamson around 1843. He was also a member of the Society of Antiquaries of Scotland. In November 1876 he is listed as their Curator of the Museum, along with Robert Carfrae.

He produced a series of drawings of buildings in the Old Town later reproduced as lithographs.

In his later life he lived at 8 Royal Crescent in the New Town of Edinburgh.

Works
Drummond specialised in historical recreations and imaginary reconstructions of past events such as:

The Porteous Mob
Montrose paraded on the Royal Mile
The Return of Mary Queen of Scots to Edinburgh
Portrait of Baroness Burdett-Coutts and her Companion Mrs Brown in Edinburgh (1874)
The Pipe-Smoker
Queen Mary's Last Look
Ancient Scottish Weapons (portfolio series)
Fisherman Drawing on his Pipe
The Fiery Cross
Old Salty (1841)
The Departure of the Bride
Border Reivers
Portrait of Robert Burns
Old Edinburgh (portfolio series)
The Old Fisherman
gravestone for Alexander Smith (poet)

References

Citations

Sources

External links
 James Drummond in the National Galleries of Scotland

1816 births
1877 deaths
19th-century Scottish painters
Scottish male painters
Scottish curators
Artists from Edinburgh
Royal Scottish Academicians
19th-century Scottish male artists